Nickelodeon is a Canadian English language discretionary specialty channel based on the American cable network of the same name owned by Corus Entertainment under a brand licensing agreement with Paramount.

As with all of its sister networks throughout the world, Nickelodeon airs programs aimed at children and young teenagers. Prior to the channel's launch, YTV and Treehouse TV served as the main outlets for both Nickelodeon and Nick Jr. programs under output agreements with Viacom. Both channels continue to premiere new original series from the U.S. networks as they are more widely distributed than the Canadian Nickelodeon channel, owing to their status as analog channels.

Nickelodeon is one of two Paramount-branded networks owned by Corus; CMT is jointly owned by the two companies.

History
In September 2008, Corus Entertainment was given approval by the Canadian Radio-television and Telecommunications Commission (CRTC) to launch a specialty channel named "YTV OneWorld", described as featuring "programming from around the world targeting children aged 6 to 17 and their families. The schedule would include programs devoted to entertainment, humour, travel, games and science and technology."

In September 2009, Corus announced it had reached an agreement with MTV Networks, a subsidiary of Viacom, to launch Nickelodeon in Canada as a domestic channel. The channel was launched as Nickelodeon on November 2, 2009, at 6 a.m. using the "YTV OneWorld" license. Jacob Two-Two was the first show to broadcast. On the day of the channel's launch, Discovery Kids (which Corus also owned) was shut down and replaced by Nickelodeon on most pay-TV providers after the last episode of Aquateam ended. Because it is legally a distinct service, subscription television companies had to reach new agreements with Corus in order to carry Nickelodeon, as Discovery Kids operated under a different license.

On April 9, 2013, Telus Optik TV launched Nickelodeon HD, a high-definition simulcast of the standard-definition feed. It was later launched on June 25, 2013, for Rogers Cable and added to Bell Fibe TV's service on October 25, 2013.

On September 22, 2015, Corus Entertainment announced the launch of Nickelodeon GO, an app that allows viewers to watch the channel live, as well as stream shows from its U.S. counterpart. The app is currently available for iOS and Android platforms, but requires a subscription to Nickelodeon from a pay-TV provider.

In June 2019, as part of the launch of Amazon Prime Video Channels in Canada, Corus launched a standalone subscription video on demand channel featuring Nickelodeon content, later branded as Nick+. On August 30, 2022, it was announced that Nick+ would be discontinued and replaced on September 1 by Teletoon+, which is oriented towards the Warner Bros. Animation library rather than Nickelodeon.

Programming

Nickelodeon primarily airs a mix of both contemporary and older original programming seen on its U.S. counterpart, with most of Nickelodeon's current programming airing on YTV and Treehouse TV. The channel also features a commercial-free, Nick Jr.-branded block of preschool programming during the daytime hours. Nickelodeon also airs programming from other Corus networks (mainly YTV and Treehouse) in order to fulfill Canadian content guidelines.

See also

 Nickelodeon (United States)
 YTV
 Treehouse TV
 Nick Jr.

References

External links
 
 Nickelodeon page on Corus Entertainment's corporate website

Children's television networks in Canada
Corus Entertainment networks
Television channels and stations established in 2009
Digital cable television networks in Canada
Canada
English-language television stations in Canada
2009 establishments in Canada